The brown fruit-eating bat (Artibeus concolor) is a bat species found in Brazil, Colombia, Ecuador, French Guiana, Guyana, Peru, Suriname and Venezuela.

References

Artibeus
Bats of South America
Bats of Brazil
Mammals of Colombia
Mammals of Ecuador
Mammals of French Guiana
Mammals of Guyana
Mammals of Peru
Mammals of Suriname
Mammals of Venezuela
Fauna of the Amazon
Mammals described in 1865
Taxa named by Wilhelm Peters